The 2006 Dutch Open was an ATP men's tennis tournament played on outdoor clay courts staged in Amersfoort, Netherlands. It was the 47th edition of the tournament that was part of the International Series of the 2006 ATP Tour. It was held from 17 July until 23 July 2006. Third-seeded Novak Djokovic won his first event of the year, and the first title of his professional career.

Finals

Singles

 Novak Djokovic defeated  Nicolás Massú 7–6(7–5), 6–4

Doubles

 Alberto Martín /  Fernando Vicente defeated  Lucas Arnold /  Christopher Kas 6–4, 6–3

References

External links
 ITF tournament edition details
 Singles draw
 Doubles draw

Dutch Open (tennis)
Dutch Open
Dutch Open (tennis)
Dutch Open (tennis), 2006